Reinas can refer to:

 Queens (film), Spanish film of 2005 directed by Manuel Gómez Pereira
 Queens (TV series), Spanish TV series of 2017 produced by José Luis Moreno
The plural of Reina, queen, in Spanish